The 2011 ITF Women's Circuit is the 2011 edition of the second tier tour for women's professional tennis. It is organised by the International Tennis Federation and is a tier below the WTA Tour. During the months of July 2011 and September 2011 over 150 tournaments were played with the majority being played in the month of August.

Key

July

August

September

See also 
 2011 ITF Women's Circuit
 2011 ITF Women's Circuit (January–March)
 2011 ITF Women's Circuit (April–June)
 2011 ITF Women's Circuit (October–December)
 2011 WTA Tour

 07-09